El Privilegio de Amar (English: The Privilege to love) is the 12th studio album by Mexican pop singer Mijares. This album was released on 22 September 1998 and it was the main theme of the telenovela of the same title. Sometimes it's called "El Privilegio de Amor" (The privilege of love).
El Privilegio de Amar was a success, reaching a high position on the charts. The lead song features Mijares's ex-wife Lucero, and sometimes it is referred to as a duet in order to make it more appealing to the public. This earned a Platinum record.

Track listing
Tracks[]:
 El privilegio de amar (with Lucero) – 3:58
 Estrella mía (Star of mine)
 Si ahora te me vas (If you leave me now)
 Yo te amaré (I will love you)
 Te extraño (I miss you)
 Puedes llamar (You may call)
 Vamos perdiendole el miedo (Let's have no fear)
 Si me miras (If you look at me, cover of "For the First Time") 
 Me vendes y me recompras (You sell me and buy me back)
 Por amor (For love)
 Si tú te vas (If you leave)
 La soledad (The solitude)

Singles
 El privilegio de amar
 Estrella mía
 Te extraño
 Si ahora te me vas
 Yo te amaré

Single charts

1998 albums
Manuel Mijares albums